{{Infobox mobile phone
| name = Huawei P50Huawei P50 Pro
| codename = 
| logo = 
| logosize = 
| image = Huawei P50 Pro Front.jpg
| imagesize = 200px
| alt = 
| caption = The front Huawei P50 Pro
| manufacturer = Huawei
| slogan = “capture what you see”
| series = Huawei P series
| released = 
| available = 
| discontinued = None
| predecessor = Huawei P40
| successor = Huawei P60
| related = Huawei Mate 40
| type = Camera phone
| form = Slate
| dimensions = 
| weight = 
| os = HarmonyOS 2.0 (Only China and Philippines)

 EMUI 12 (International)
| soc = HiSilicon Kirin 9000
Qualcomm Snapdragon 888 4G
| cpu = Octa-core 
Kirin 9000
(1x 3.13 GHz Cortex A77, 3x 2.54 GHz Cortex A77, 4x 2.05 GHz Cortex-A55)

Snapdragon 888 4G
(1x 2.84 GHz Cortex X1, 3x 2.42 GHz Cortex A78, 4x 1.80 GHz Cortex-A55)
| gpu = Kirin 9000
Mali-G78 MP24

Snapdragon 888 4G
Adreno 660
| memory = 
| storage = 
| memory_card = Nano Memory, expandable up to 256 GB
| battery = 
| input = GPS/Glonass/BDS/Galileo/QZSS, accelerometer, gyroscope, compass, proximity sensor
| display = 
| rear_camera = 
| front_camera = 13 MP, autofocus, f/2.4 (P50) or f/2.4, 4k@30fps, 1080p@30fps/60fps/240fps
| sound = 
| connectivity = Wi-Fi, 802.11a/b/g/n/ac/ax with Wi-Fi Direct support, BT5.1, BLE, USB Type C 3.1
| networks = 2G, 3G, 4G, 4G LTE
| other = 
| website = Huawei P50Huawei P50 Pro
| references = 
| sim = nanoSIM
| charging = P50: 66w SuperchargeP50 Pro: 66w wired+50w wireless Supercharge
}}

The Huawei P50 and P50 Pro''' are HarmonyOS-based high-end smartphones manufactured by Huawei. Unveiled on 21 July 2021, they succeed the Huawei P40 in the P series. In March 2023 Huawei will release their  Huawei P60 Series Xmage.

Specifications

Hardware 
Unlike the Huawei P40 hardware, the P50 uses the Qualcomm Snapdragon SM8325 888 4G processor. The P50 operates on Octa-core (1x2.84 GHz Kryo 680 & 3x2.42 GHz Kryo 680 & 4x1.80 GHz Kryo 680) which is an upgrade from the previous version on the P40.

The P50 operates on the Adreno 660 GPU. The phone has 8GB ram only and has 128 GB or 256 GB storage space which allows for more storage and smooth run of the device. Expansion is supported up to 256 GB via Huawei's proprietary Nano Memory card. The P50 display was upgraded by 0.4 from the previous P40 which had 6.1 for display. The new 6.5 inches (101.6 cm) 88.0% screen-to-body ratio with a resolution of 2700 x 1224 pixels OLED with a 1B color and 90Hz refresh rate. The P50 model has an optical (under-screen) fingerprint sensor.

The P50 uses a 4100 mAh non-removable battery, an upgrade from its previous 3800 mAh on P40.

Camera 
The Huawei P50 series features Leica optics. The wide lens on P50 and P50 Pro is a new "True-Form" 50 MP IMX766 sensor. Unlike the P40, whose wide lens uses an "Ultra SuperSpectrum" image sensor, P50 uses traditional RGGB sensor instead. The P50's rear camera array consists of a 50 MP wide lens, a 13MP 16mm ultrawide lens and an 12MP telephoto lens with 5x optical zoom. 
For P50 Pro, 50 MP wide lens now has optical image stabilization. The 13 MP ultrawide is now wider in 13mm, the periscope telephoto now has a 64 MP sensor at 3.5x and an additional 40 MP monochrome sensor to capture more light.
The software is also improved with a new Golden Snap feature that takes a burst of HDR+ photos and automatically picks the best shots. A Profoto studio light will be available as an accessory as well.

Software 
The device runs on HarmonyOS 2.0. The P50 series support Huawei Mobile Services uses Huawei AppGallery as its main app store. Furthermore, a new app known as Petal Search was introduced, which includes web search via France-based Qwant and Russia-based Yandex, as well as the ability to search for third-party apps via other Android app stores and APK mirroring websites.

References 

Flagship smartphones
Huawei smartphones
Mobile phones introduced in 2021
Mobile phones with multiple rear cameras
Mobile phones with 4K video recording
Mobile phones with infrared transmitter